Facundo Argüello was the defending champion but chose not to defend his title.

Facundo Bagnis won the title after Carlos Berlocq retired trailing 7–5, 2–6, 0–3 in the final.

Seeds

Draw

Finals

Top half

Bottom half

References
Main Draw
Qualifying Draw

Campeonato Internacional de Tenis de Campinas - Singles